The Enterprise is an amusement ride, manufactured primarily by HUSS Park Attractions and Anton Schwarzkopf beginning in 1972. The HUSS ride was an adaptation and improvement of a design produced earlier that year by Schwarzkopf, with an increased passenger capacity. Despite not owning the original incarnation of the ride, HUSS was issued the patent.

Although Schwarzkopf was the first to build the more standard Enterprise, the overall design was actually predated by another ride, the Passat, which first opened in 1964. This is only considered a precursor, however, as the mechanism used to lift the arm up and down as well as the overall look of the ride is much different from a typical Enterprise.

The ride is named after USS Enterprise from the TV series Star Trek. The backdrop is decorated with space-themed art and a silhouette of the starship Enterprise.

Enterprises are manufactured by HUSS, Schwarzkopf, and Heinz Fähtz; all sharing the name Enterprise. Both trailer and park versions have been created and are in use.

In 2015, Italian manufacturer Zamperla introduced the Endeavour, a new ride billed as being based on the Enterprise. This ride mainly differs in its seating and restraint configuration, which is floorless with over-the-shoulder restraints.

Design and operation 

In the ride, up to two people sit in one of 20 gondolas arranged in a circle, one in front of the other. The ride moves clockwise, dispelling a slight amount of centrifugal force. A hydraulically powered arm underneath the ride then raises and tilts the frame so that the ride is rotating at 87° from the horizontal, transforming the ride from a horizontal experience to a nearly vertical one.

On most Enterprise models, there are no safety restraints inside the enclosed gondolas; the force applied to the riders is sufficient to keep them pinned in their seats. However, some models have been fitted with seat belts. The transportable version of the ride racks onto two trailers, the first carrying the wheel, arm, and drive systems while the second is loaded with the gondolas, platforms, and any additional equipment. The first trailer also acts as the base of the ride while in operation.

Variants

Passat 

Much like any other Enterprise-type ride, the Passat has a number of caged gondolas, in this case 12, that sit around a circular frame, which, in turn, sits on the end of an arm. But what makes this ride different from an Enterprise is that the center of the frame, as well as the end of the arm, is fitted around an arc-shaped pillar, which is used to raise and lower the arm in order to tilt it from horizontal to vertical. The earliest known machine, Passat, was originally built by German show family Winter, who started traveling it to funfairs in 1964. Later machines were built by Klaus and possibly Heinz Fähtz. Although the whereabouts of these rides are mostly unknown, there is one, known as Super Passat, which is currently believed to be in storage.

Giant Enterprise/SkyLab
In the early 1980s, HUSS produced a larger version of the Enterprise called the SkyLab. Most SkyLabs have been dismantled; however, there is one known model still operating: Cyclone at Parque Del Café in Montenegro, Quindio, Colombia.

UFO 

HUSS used the basis of the Enterprise for another ride called the UFO. This ride was similar in operation, but the cars did not swing freely and riders stood up facing the center of the ride. Similarly to most Enterprise rides, there are no restraints due to the centrifugal force experienced on the ride. This ride is no longer in production.

Fly Away 

HUSS also used the design of the Enterprise for a newer attraction called Fly Away. In this version, riders lay on their stomachs to simulate the feeling of flying. This version also has the capability to spin riders forwards or backwards.

Schwarzkopf 

The Schwarzkopf versions of the Enterprise have either 16 or 21 gondolas, thus having a different diameter of the wheel. The gondolas are also smaller than the HUSS version. Originally, the gondolas were produced in-house; they were later replaced by gondolas manufactured separately by Reverchon.

Heinz Fähtz 

Heinz Fähtz manufactured some 16-gondola Enterprises. The only known operating park model is at Darien Lake, installed in 1981. Another portable ride is traveled in New Zealand by Mahons Amusements, loading on 2 trailers complete with backflash.

Emiliana Luna Park 

The Emiliana Luna Park version of the Enterprise has 20 gondolas. One Enterprise manufactured by Emiliana Luna Park, named Kehrä, is located at Linnanmäki amusement park in Finland.

Senyo Kogyo Co. 

One model is known to be operating currently at Yokohama Cosmo World. Super Planet is comparable to the Huss Giant Enterprise models, as they both feature similar gondolas that accommodate four riders in two seats. Unlike the Huss version which has only 15 gondolas, the Senyo Kogyo version has 20, which allows for a total of 80 passengers. This makes it one of the largest Enterprise rides in size and capacity.

Appearances 

 Note: The Schwarzkopf Park Model versions of the ride are indicated with "(SDC)" following the park or operator name. The Heinz Fähtz Enterprise is marked "(HF)".

Current rides
 Argentina – At least two; Enterprise I at Parque de la Ciudad and Enterprise II (SDC) at Parque de la Ciudad
 Australia – At least three; The Enterprise at Luna Park Melbourne, one traveling model, and a third under refurbishment, location unknown.
 Canada – At least two; Enterprise  at Playland, The STORM, at Calaway Park, and several portable models
 Colombia – At least one; Cyclone at Parque Nacional del Café
Chile - Super Hero (Fly Away) at Fantasilandia
 Denmark – At least two; Enterprise at Bakken (disassembled and is to be renovated and sold) and 'Solhjulet' at Sommerland Syd
 Egypt – One in Dream Park; largest amusement park in Egypt and the Middle East
 Estonia – At least one; a traveling model owned by Tivoli Tuur. Got into fire in 2007; 41 were injured.
 Finland – Two; Enterprise (Huss) at PowerPark amusement park (from 2019)  and Kehrä (Emiliana Luna Park) at Linnanmäki amusement park (from 2009).
 France – At least one Enterprise; Gravity at Kingoland.
 Germany – One travelling Enterprise; Mondlift owned by Zehle., plus a few stationary Enterprises in different amusement parks – all manufactured by Huss.
 Italy - Enterprise Famiglia bellucci "Puglia" (HUSS) ... (Trailer Mode) Year 2014
 India − At least five; three at Mumbai (2 at Six Flags, 1 at Play Land), 1 in New Delhi at Essel World and 1 at Hydrabad at Musky Mountain.
 Japan - At least one; Super Planet manufactured by Senyo Kogyo at Yokohama Cosmo World.
 Nigeria – One of its kind Enterprise at Hi Impact Planet Amusement park & Resort, Lagos Ibadan Expressway Ibafo (HF)
 Netherlands – At least four; Enterprise (SDC) at Attractiepark Slagharen, G-Force at Walibi Holland, Kwal at Drievliet and Tarantula Magica at Avonturenpark Hellendoorn.
 New Zealand – One traveling; Enterprise at Mahons Amusements (HF)
Poland - One; Enterprise (HUSS) at Śląskie Wesołe Miasteczko, Chorzów.
 United Kingdom At least four; Enterprise at Dreamland Margate, Zodiac at Thorpe Park, Enterprise at Alton Towers, and a traveling Enterprise owned by Funfair Props.
 United States of America – At least ten; Centennial Screamer at Lagoon Amusement Park; Enterprise at Dorney Park, Fun Spot America (Orlando; SDC), the Strates Shows traveling railway carnival, and Murphy Bros. Exposition; Flyin' Tiger at Blue Bayou and Dixie Landin'; The Orbit (SDC) at California's Great America; Scream Weaver (SDC) at Carowinds; Silver Bullet at Six Flags Darien Lake (HF); and Zulu at Worlds of Fun.

Past appearances 
The following Enterprise rides at the following amusement parks are now defunct.
 Note: The Schwarzkopf Park Model versions of the ride are indicated with "(SDC)" following the park or operator name. 

 Alakazam (Fly-Away) at Pleasure Island, Cleethorpes (2002-2016) moved to Fantasilandia, Chile
 Apple Turnover (SDC) at Kings Dominion (1976–1991)
 Black Widow's Web at Lightwater Valley (2001-2017)
 Cíclope at Reino Aventura (1982-1994)
 Cyclops at Hersheypark
 Enterprise at Camden Park (closed in 1993)
 Enterprise at Loudon Castle, Scotland (?–2010), closed when the park went defunct
 Enterprise at Rocky Point Amusement Park (closed in 1994)
 Enterprise at Lake Compounce (1986-2015), moved to Kennywood and operated through 2020.
 Enterprise at Boblo Island Amusement Park (????-1993)
 Enterprise at Parque de Atracciones de Vizcaya (closed in 1990)
 Enterprise (Huss Portable Model) at Six Flags Great Adventure (1975–1977)
 Spin Meister (SDC) at Six Flags Great Adventure (1979–2005), originally named Enterprise.
 Enterprise (Huss Portable Model) at Tusenfryd (1988–2006). Moved to Lindströms Tivoli in Sweden (2006), and to a Swedish showman, Håkan Skogh (2006–2009). From 2010 owner Troost-Spel in the Netherlands.
 Enterprise (later renamed Inferno) at Walibi Belgium (1977-2010) 
 Enterprise at Wasalandia (1988–1996)
 Enterprise at Mariner's Landing, Wildwood, NJ (1977-1999)
 Enterprise at Oaks Amusement Park
 Enterprise at Fun Forest, Seattle Center (closed ca. 2009)
 Enterprise at Valleyfair (closed in 2016)
 Enterprise (SDC) at Tykkimäki (1999-2017)
 Enterprise at Kentucky Kingdom (closed in 2017)
 Enterprise at Casino Pier (1975-2012; destroyed by Hurricane Sandy), reportedly the first Enterprise in the United States.
 Highland Fling (SDC) at Six Flags St. Louis (1977-2017)
 La Turbina (SDC) at Parque de Atracciones de Madrid
 Loop Trainer Flying Machine (SDC) at Knott's Berry Farm (1976–1989)
 Nightwing at Six Flags New England (closed in 2008)
 Orbit (SDC) at Six Flags Great America (closed in 2016)
 The Orbiter at Canada's Wonderland (SkyLab) (1981-2018)
 Reactor at Six Flags Magic Mountain (1977–1993) (originally named Enterprise from 1977 to 1987)
 Reef Diver at Dreamworld (1983 -2014) (originally named Enterprise from 1983 to 2002)
 Rodeo Round-Up at Frontier City (closed in 2015)
 Silver Bullet at Geauga Lake (1976–2004) (originally named Enterprise from 1976 to 1996)
 Skylab at Great Escape (closed in 2001)
 Skylab at Kings Island (1986–1997)
 Sky Loop at Luna Park, Tel Aviv (SkyLab, previously travelled in Germany in 1979–1990)
 Space Wheel at Ocean Park Hong Kong (1984–2015)
 Vertigo at Alabama Adventure (1998-2011; in storage 2003-2006)
 Volcano at Kennywood (1978-2015; 2016-2020), originally named Enterprise. Structure replaced with former Lake Compounce model from 2016-2020.
 Wagon Wheel (SDC) at Six Flags Fiesta Texas (1996–2011) (originally at Six Flags Over Texas from 1977 to 1995 as Spinnaker)
 Wheelie (SDC) at Six Flags Over Georgia (1977–2012), removed and closed to make way for SkyScreamer. Moved to Fun Spot America Theme Parks Orlando park in 2013.
 Witches' Wheel (Huss) at Cedar Point (1977-2018)

Incidents

References 

Amusement rides
Upside-down amusement rides
Amusement rides introduced in 1972
Outer space in amusement parks